Bogue Hasty is a stream in the U.S. state of Mississippi.

Bogue Hasty is a name derived from the Choctaw language, and it most likely means "dead-leaves creek".

References

Rivers of Mississippi
Rivers of Bolivar County, Mississippi
Mississippi placenames of Native American origin